Yasmim Assis Ribeiro (born 28 October 1996) is a Brazilian professional footballer who plays as a defender for Corinthians.

Club career

After scoring 17 goals in 37 appearances for Portuguese club Benfica, Yasmim returned to Brazil to play for Corinthians again in August 2020.

International career
Yasmim made her debut for the Brazil national team on 20 September 2021 against Argentina, coming on as a substitute for Tamires and scoring a goal in the second half of the match.

References

1996 births
Living people
Women's association football defenders
Brazilian women's footballers
People from Governador Valadares
Sportspeople from Minas Gerais
São José Esporte Clube (women) players
Sport Club Corinthians Paulista (women) players
S.L. Benfica (women) footballers
Campeonato Nacional de Futebol Feminino players
Campeonato Brasileiro de Futebol Feminino Série A1 players
Brazilian expatriate women's footballers
Expatriate women's footballers in Portugal
Brazilian expatriate sportspeople in Portugal
Brazil women's international footballers